The following are lists of stars. These are astronomical objects that spend some portion of their existence generating energy through thermonuclear fusion.

By location
 Lists of stars by constellation

By name
 List of traditional star names
 List of Arabic star names
 List of Chinese star names
 Stars named after people

By proximity
 List of nearest stars and brown dwarfs (up to 20 light-years)
 List of star systems within 20–25 light-years
 List of star systems within 25–30 light-years
 List of star systems within 30–35 light-years
 List of star systems within 35–40 light-years
 List of star systems within 40–45 light-years
 List of star systems within 45–50 light-years
 List of star systems within 50–55 light-years
 List of star systems within 55–60 light-years
 List of star systems within 60–65 light-years
 List of star systems within 65–70 light-years
 List of star systems within 70–75 light-years
 List of star systems within 75–80 light-years
 List of nearest bright stars
 List of brightest stars
 List of stars more luminous than any closer star

By physical characteristic
 List of brightest stars
 List of most luminous stars
 List of most massive stars
 List of largest stars
 List of smallest stars
 List of oldest stars
 List of least massive stars
 List of hottest stars

By variability or other factor
 List of brown dwarfs
 List of collapsars (black holes)
 List of notable variable stars
 List of semiregular variable stars
 List of stars that have unusual dimming periods
 List of stars with confirmed extrasolar planets
 List of supernova candidates
 List of white dwarfs
 List of red dwarfs

Other star listings
 List of brightest stars and other record stars
 List of extremes in the sky
 List of hypothetical stars
 List of selected stars for navigation
 List of star extremes
 List of stars with resolved images
 List of supernovae
 Solar twins (Solar analogs)
 Stars and planetary systems in fiction

Other stars
The following is a list of particularly notable actual or hypothetical stars that have their own articles in Wikipedia, but are not included in the lists above.
 BPM 37093 — a diamond star
 Cygnus X-1 — X-ray source
 EBLM J0555-57Ab — is one of the smallest stars ever discovered.
 HR 465 — chemically-peculiar variable star
 MACS J1149 Lensed Star 1 (or Icarus) — second most distant star, 9 billion light years away.
 P Cygni — suddenly brightened in the 17th century
 WNC4 — Messier Object 40
 Zeta Boötis — speckle binary test system

See also
 Lists of astronomical objects
 Astronomical naming conventions
 Star
 Star catalogue
 Sun

References
 The Bright Star Catalog, Astronomical Data Center, NSSDC/ADC, 1991.
  Astronomiches Rechen-Institut Heidelberg — ARICNS Database for Nearby Stars
 Northern Arizona University database of nearby stars
 SIMBAD Astronomical Database

Specific

External links
International Astronomical Union: IAU
 Sol Station — information on nearby and bright stars.

 
Light sources